The University Match (hockey) is generally held to refer to the annual field hockey fixture between Cambridge University and Oxford University. The Men's fixture was first contested in 1890 and the Women's in 1898. 

In 2002, both fixtures were played on the same date for the first time. 

The contest has taken place at Southgate Hockey Club since 2003, prior to which the game took place at a variety of venues across the UK. 

The annual contest between the University's second and third teams takes place in February, alternating venue between Oxford's Iffley Road Pitch and Cambridge's recently re-laid Wilberforce Road Pitch. 

The 2022 Men's fixture was won 3-1 by Oxford.  

Oxford's Women retained their title with a 2-0 win.  

The 2023 fixture is to take place at Southgate Hockey Club on Sunday 12 March 2023.

The match is currently sponsored by JMAN Group, a leading management consultancy.

Results 

Oxford currently hold both the women's and men’s title having won the fixtures 2-0 and 3-1 respectively in 2022.

Cambridge last won both fixtures in 2020.

In the last decade, shuffles have decided matches that are level at the end of normal playing time.

Similar to a football penalty shoot out, shuffles gives 5 players from each team a period of eight seconds to beat the keeper when starting from the 23 yard line.    

Cambridge have won on shuffles three times (Men in 2015 & 2021, Women in 2020).  

Oxford Men won on shuffles in 2017

Women 

Cambridge – 50 wins

Oxford – 48 wins

Drawn – 24

Men 

Cambridge – 56 wins

Oxford – 48 wins

Drawn – 17

Goals 

Cambridge: 237

Oxford: 229

References

Hockey
Sport at the University of Oxford
Sport at the University of Cambridge
Recurring events established in 1890